Richard Eugene Glossip (born February 9, 1963) is an American prisoner currently on death row at Oklahoma State Penitentiary after being convicted of commissioning the 1997 murder of Barry Van Treese. The man who murdered Van Treese, Justin Sneed (aged 19 when he committed the crime), had a "meth habit" and agreed to plead guilty in exchange for testifying against Glossip. Sneed received a life sentence without parole. Glossip's case has attracted international attention due to the unusual nature of his conviction, namely that there was little or no corroborating evidence, with the first case against him described as "extremely weak" by the Oklahoma Court of Criminal Appeals.

Glossip is notable for his role as named plaintiff in the 2015 Supreme Court case Glossip v. Gross, which ruled that executions carried out by a three-drug protocol of midazolam, pancuronium bromide, and potassium chloride did not constitute cruel and unusual punishment under the Eighth Amendment to the United States Constitution.

In September and October 2015, Glossip was granted three successive stays of execution due to questions about Oklahoma's lethal injection drugs after Oklahoma Department of Corrections officials used potassium acetate instead of potassium chloride to execute Charles Frederick Warner on January 15, 2015, contrary to protocol. Oklahoma Attorney General Scott Pruitt ordered a multicounty grand jury investigation of the execution drug mix-up.

Murder of Barry Van Treese 
On January 7, 1997, Justin Sneed beat Barry Van Treese to death with a baseball bat. The killing occurred at the Best Budget Inn in Oklahoma City, Oklahoma, where Van Treese was the owner, Sneed was the maintenance man, and Glossip was the manager. In exchange for avoiding the death penalty, Sneed confessed and told police that Glossip had instructed him to commit the murder.

Glossip insisted on his actual innocence and refused to accept a plea bargain. In July 1998, an Oklahoma jury convicted Glossip of the murder and sentenced him to death. In 2001, the unanimous Oklahoma Court of Criminal Appeals threw out that conviction, calling the case "extremely weak" and finding Glossip had received unconstitutionally ineffective assistance of counsel.

In August 2004, a second Oklahoma jury convicted Glossip of the murder and sentenced him to death. Glossip complained that prosecutors had intimidated his defense attorney into resigning. However, in April 2007, the Oklahoma Court of Criminal Appeals affirmed the death sentence, with two judges in the majority, one judge specially concurring, and two judges dissenting. Glossip attracted the advocacy of Sister Helen Prejean, but failed to get the clemency board to consider letters from Sneed’s family, who believe Sneed is lying.

Innocence controversy 
Glossip's legal team asserts that Justin Sneed was addicted to methamphetamine at the time that he murdered Van Treese, and that he habitually broke into vehicles in the parking lot of the Best Budget Inn while he was employed as a maintenance man. Glossip's execution is controversial because he was convicted almost entirely on the testimony of Sneed, who confessed to bludgeoning Van Treese to death with an aluminum baseball bat by himself and who was spared a death sentence himself by implicating Glossip.

In 2015, Oklahoma City police released a 1999 police report showing that a box of evidence had been marked for destruction. The report was never provided to attorneys who represented Glossip in his second trial or his appeals, according to his new defense team. In an interview published the same day, Glossip's attorney, Donald Knight, criticised his previous attorneys, saying "They did a terrible job. Horrible. No preparation. No investigation."

On September 22, 2015, Glossip's attorneys filed papers referring to a July 1997 psychiatric evaluation of Sneed, in which he said he understood he was charged with murder in connection with a burglary and made no reference to Glossip's involvement.

On September 23, 2015, Glossip's attorneys filed papers asserting that two new witnesses were being intimidated. In affidavits, one witness had claimed that Sneed laughed about lying in court about Glossip's involvement; another said he was convinced based on his conversations with Sneed that Sneed acted alone. On September 24, 2015, the Oklahoma Attorney General's Office filed papers stating that the claims of the new witnesses were "inherently suspect," and that the time it took Van Treese to die and whether blood loss contributed to his death did not affect the trial outcome, in response to a defense claim that the testimony of Dr. Chai Choi, who performed the autopsy, was incorrect.

On September 28, 2015, the Oklahoma Court of Criminal Appeals voted 3-2 to proceed with execution. Presiding Judge Clancy Smith wrote "While finality of judgment is important, the state has no interest in executing an actually innocent man. An evidentiary hearing will give Glossip the chance to prove his allegations that Sneed has recanted, or demonstrate to the court that he cannot provide evidence that would exonerate him." Judge Arlene Johnson wrote that the original trial was "deeply flawed" and an evidentiary hearing should be ordered.

On September 30, 2015, Glossip spoke to the UK's Sky News on the telephone from his cell as he was served his last meal. Glossip said that Sneed testified at trial that Glossip did not wear or own gloves, "And now he's on TV saying that I did. It continues to show the discrepancies in anything that Justin Sneed has to say." On the same day, Virgin CEO Richard Branson bought an advertisement in The Oklahoman newspaper which had campaigned against the execution, with Branson stating the evidence against Glossip is flawed and that "every person is deserving of a fair trial," adding, "Your state is about to execute a man whose guilt has not been proven beyond a reasonable doubt." The United States Supreme Court denied a stay of execution. Justice Stephen Breyer wrote that he would grant a stay.

In July 2022, Oklahoma Pardon and Parole Board member Richard Smothermon, who had to that point voted to deny clemency to every death row inmate seeking it, voted to recuse himself from voting because his wife was a prosecutor on the case. In August 2022, 61 lawmakers urged Attorney General John O'Connor to support Glossip's request for a new hearing because without "support from O'Connor, the Court of Criminal Appeals is expected to reject Glossip's claims of innocence, as it has done before."

High-profile supporters 
Glossip has several high-profile supporters of his innocence, including Mark Ruffalo, Peter Sarsgaard, Sir Richard Branson, Susan Sarandon, Sister Helen Prejean, and Pope Francis. In 2022, state Rep. Kevin McDugle said "he would fight to end the death penalty if Glossip dies."

Oklahoma lethal injection protocol controversy 
On October 13, 2014, the Oklahoma Attorney General said the state did not have an adequate supply of execution drugs and delayed the execution of Glossip and two other inmates. On January 28, 2015, the U.S. Supreme Court halted executions in Oklahoma until it decided on lethal injection drugs.

Governor Mary Fallin stayed the execution after the Department of Corrections received potassium acetate instead of potassium chloride. The execution was reset for November 6, 2015.

On October 1, 2015, Attorney General Scott Pruitt asked the Court of Criminal Appeals to issue an indefinite stay of all scheduled executions in Oklahoma, citing the Department of Correction's acquisition of a drug contrary to protocol. The next day, the request was granted.

On October 6, 2015, Governor Mary Fallin said she hired an independent attorney, Robert McCampbell, to advise her on the legal process.

On October 8, 2015, it was reported that Oklahoma Corrections Department officials used potassium acetate to execute Charles Frederick Warner on January 15, 2015, contrary to protocol. An attorney representing Glossip and other Oklahoma death row inmates said logs from Warner's execution initialed by a prison staff member indicated the use of potassium chloride; however, an autopsy report showed 12 vials of potassium acetate were used.

According to a report on October 16, 2015, due to a grand jury investigation, it was likely the state would not conduct an execution for more than a year.

Midazolam controversy 
Glossip was the named plaintiff in Glossip v. Gross, a U.S. Supreme Court case decided in June 2015 in which a divided Court ruled 5-4 with Antonin Scalia, Clarence Thomas, Samuel Alito, John Roberts, and Anthony Kennedy, voting to allow the execution to proceed, and Stephen Breyer, Elena Kagan, Sonia Sotomayor, and Ruth Bader Ginsburg voting to halt it. Sotomayor wrote, "But under the court's new rule, it would not matter whether the state intended to use midazolam, or instead to have petitioners drawn and quartered, slowly tortured to death or actually burned at the stake." The court found the drug midazolam may be used as a sedative in combination with other lethal injection drugs. The case was originally titled Warner v. Gross, but Glossip replaced Charles Frederick Warner as the plaintiff after Warner was executed in January 2015, also by Oklahoma, before the case was decided. The case was reopened in March 2020 as Glossip v. Chandler after Oklahoma ended its moratorium on the death penalty, with plaintiffs challenging Oklahoma's execution protocol.

Scheduled execution 
On July 1, 2022, Glossip was one of twenty-five death row inmates to be scheduled for execution in Oklahoma. He was scheduled to be executed on September 22, 2022.

On August 16, 2022, Oklahoma Governor Kevin Stitt granted a 60 day stay of execution. Glossip was then scheduled to be executed on December 8, 2022. On November 3, 2022, Governor Stitt again granted a stay of execution for Glossip, allowing time for the Oklahoma Court of Criminal Appeals to address his pending legal proceedings. He was rescheduled to be executed on February 16, 2023. On January 24, 2023, Glossip's execution was rescheduled to May 18, 2023, after Attorney General Gentner Drummond requested a new execution timetable to accommodate for staff shortages within the Department of Corrections.

In popular culture 
In 2017, Killing Richard Glossip, a four-part TV series about Glossip's innocence controversy and Oklahoma execution scandal premiered on Investigation Discovery.

Personal life
While on death row, Richard Glossip married Leigha Joy Jurasik of New Jersey at the Oklahoma State Penitentiary on 27 September 2018.  The couple divorced in February 2021.  Glossip had a "relationship" with Melissa Ratliff, who first contacted him in 2015.  Their contact ended in January 2021.  Both Jurasik and Ratliff accused Glossip of threatening them.  In March 2022, he married Lea Rodger of Florida, an anti-death penalty advocate.

See also 
 Capital punishment in Oklahoma
 Execution of Clayton Lockett
 Julius Jones, inmate from Oklahoma who has also proclaimed his innocence
 List of death row inmates in the United States
 List of people scheduled to be executed in the United States
 John M. O'Connor
 Oklahoma Pardon and Parole Board
 Richard Smothermon
 Edward J. Konieczny
 Cathy Stocker
 Larry Morris

References

External links
 Oklahoma Department of Corrections - Death Row - Scheduled Executions (accessed September 16, 2015)

1963 births
2015 in American law
2015 in Oklahoma
Living people
People convicted of murder by Oklahoma
Place of birth missing (living people)
Prisoners sentenced to death by Oklahoma